İnlice is a town (belde) and municipality in the Sincik District, Adıyaman Province, Turkey. It is populated by Kurds of the Reşwan tribe and had a population of 2,192 in 2021.

References

Towns in Turkey
Populated places in Adıyaman Province
Sincik District
Kurdish settlements in Adıyaman Province